Marcus Benjamin (1857–1932) was an American editor, born at San Francisco, California, and educated at the Columbia University School of Mines.  After following his profession of chemist for several years, he turned to editorial work.

Dr. Benjamin worked on a number of reference works, as:  
 Appletons' Cyclopædia of American Biography
 Standard Dictionary
 Universal Cyclopædia
 New International Encyclopædia
 Appleton's New Practical Cyclopædia, (six volumes, 1910).

From 1896, he was the editor of the publications of the United States National Museum. He was an aide in the office of Naval Intelligence during World War I, and received a decoration by France.  He was a fellow of the Chemical Society.

References

External links
Marcus Benjamin Papers, 1886-1929 from the Smithsonian Institution Archives

Writers from San Francisco
1857 births
1932 deaths
American chemists
American editors
Columbia School of Engineering and Applied Science alumni
Historians from California